Starkville is a city in, and the county seat of, Oktibbeha County, Mississippi, United States.  Mississippi State University is a land-grant institution and is located partially in Starkville but primarily in an adjacent unincorporated area designated by the United States Census Bureau as Mississippi State, Mississippi. The population was 25,653 in 2019. Starkville is the most populous city of the Golden Triangle region of Mississippi. The Starkville micropolitan statistical area includes all of Oktibbeha County.

The growth and development of Mississippi State in recent decades has made Starkville a marquee American college town. College students and faculty have created a ready audience for several annual art and entertainment events such as the Cotton District Arts Festival, Super Bulldog Weekend, and Bulldog Bash. The Cotton District, North America's oldest new urbanist community, is an active student quarter and entertainment district located halfway between Downtown Starkville and the Mississippi State University campus.

History
The Starkville area has been inhabited for over 2,100 years. Artifacts in the form of clay pot fragments and artwork dating from that time period have been found east of Starkville at the Herman Mound and Village site, which is listed on the National Register of Historic Places. The village site can be accessed from the Indian Mound Campground. The earthwork mounds were made by early Native Americans of moundbuilder cultures as part of their religious and political cosmology.

Shortly before the American Revolutionary War period, the area was inhabited by the Choccuma (or Chakchiuma) tribe. They were annihilated about that time by a rare alliance between the Choctaw and Chickasaw peoples.

Early 19th Century
The modern European-American settlement of the Starkville area was started after the Choctaw inhabitants of Oktibbeha County surrendered their claims to land in the area in the Treaty of Dancing Rabbit Creek in 1830. Most of the Native Americans of the Southeast were forced west of the Mississippi River during the 1830s and Indian Removal.

White settlers were drawn to the Starkville area because of two large springs, which Native Americans had used for thousands of years. A mill on the Big Black River southwest of town produced clapboards, giving the town its original name, Boardtown in 1834. The first court met in 1834 under a large tree. In 1835, when Boardtown was established as the county seat of Oktibbeha County, it was renamed as Starkville in honor of Revolutionary War hero General John Stark. A log courthouse and a one-room jailhouse were constructed in 1835. The jailhouse was unusual in that it had no doors or windows. Prisoners were made to climb a ladder to the roof and then let down through a trap door using a rope.

The first newspaper was founded in 1847. Originally titled The Starkville Whig, it was later renamed The Broad Ax.

Reconstruction to the 20th century
In 1865, during reconstruction, the officer in charge of Starkville allowed a black man accused of raping a white girl to be lynched by running him down with hounds.

In 1875 a fire destroyed 52 buildings. The entire business district was destroyed.

A carpetbagger named McLaughlin, who served as the local head of the Freedmen's Bureau, assisted in the establishment of a black Methodist church and established a cooperative store for blacks in his home. This enraged the white citizens so the Klan attacked the store.

On May 5, 1879, two black men who had been accused of burning a barn, Nevlin Porter and Johnson Spencer, were taken from the jail by a mob of men and hung from crossties of the Mobile and Ohio Railroad.

In 1888, a mob hanged an African-American man, Eli Bryant, for an alleged attack on a white woman.

Several newspapers were founded in this time period, including The Starkville News in 1891. Early banks included The Peoples Bank in 1889 and Security State Bank in 1896.

A yellow fever epidemic in 1898 resulted in a quarantine of Starkville's railroads by the towns of West Point, Columbus, Artesia and Kosciusko. This resulted in a depletion of medical and other supplies which ultimately resulted in intervention by the state.

20th century
Before the Civil War, Colonel Montgomery imported cattle from the isle of Jersey, initiating the areas prominence as a dairy center. In 1912, the co-operative creamery was created, and in 1926 the Borden Condensary was established.

In April 1912, Gabe (sometimes reported as Abe) Coleman, an African-American man was accused of attacking a farmer's wife and was shot to death by a mob. Nine men were tried for the murder. In February 1912, another African-American man, Mann Hamilton, was murdered by a mob for allegedly attacking a woman. Following an incident in which whites fired into a Republican Meeting at a church in Chapel Hill, Mississippi, killing a black man, a group of black men planned a march in Starkville. They were met at a bridge near the A & M dairy barn by white men from Starkville and West Point armed with cannon loaded with buckshot and iron.

In 1915, two African-American men, Dit Seals and Peter Bolen, were hanged in a public execution while a crowd of 5,000, including blacks and whites, and children watched and sang There is a Land of Pure Delight. The crowd ate lunch while the execution was being conducted. Vendors were on hand selling popcorn, soda water and sandwiches. The men had been convicted of killing Willie Taylor, an African-American porter on the Mobile and Ohio Railroad. The story was widely reported as a "gala hanging" sponsored by the merchants of Starkville by various newspapers including the New York World and Chicago Tribune, while the Detroit Times described it as little better than a lynching.

In 1922, Starkville was the site of a large rally of the Ku Klux Klan.

In 1926 the Borden Condensery was established, the first condensery in the southern U.S. At the time, Starkville was served by two railroads, the Illinois Central and the Mobile and Ohio.

In 1970, several Black organizations organized a boycott or selective buying campaign. This was met with firebombings, and a crowd of African-Americans assembled near Henderson High School was broken up by gunfire.

21st Century
On March 21, 2006, Starkville became the first city in Mississippi to adopt a smoking ban for indoor public places, including restaurants and bars. This ordinance went into effect on May 20, 2006.

In February 2018, Starkville denied a local LGBTQ organization a permit to host a pride parade. The organizers initiated legal action, after which the city reversed its decision. The parade was held in March 2018 with almost 3,000 attendees.

Geography
According to the United States Census Bureau, the city has a total area of 25.8 square miles (66.9 km²), of which 25.7 square miles (66.5 km) is land and 0.2 square miles (0.4 km) (0.58%) is water.

U.S. Route 82 and Mississippi Highways 12 and 25 are major roads through Starkville. US 82 runs east to west across the northern portion of the city as a bypass, leading east  to Columbus and northwest  to Eupora. Route 25 leads south  to Louisville and Route 12 leads southwest  to Ackerman. The nearest airport with scheduled service is Golden Triangle Regional Airport (GTR). George M. Bryan Field (KSTF) serves as Starkville's general aviation airport. There are multiple privately owned airstrips in the area.

Climate

Demographics

2020 census

As of the 2020 United States Census, there were 24,360 people, 10,092 households, and 4,895 families residing in the city.

2010 census
As of the 2010 United States Census, there were 23,888 people, 9,845 households, and 4,800 families residing in the city. The population density was 936.4 people per square mile (328.7/km). There were 11,767 housing units at an average density of 396.7/sq mi (153.2/km). The racial makeup of the city was 58.5% white, 34.06%  African American, 0.2%  Native American, 3.75% Asian, 0.1% Pacific Islander, 0.64% from other races, and 1.3% from two or more races. Hispanics or Latinos of any race were 1.8% of the population.

There were 9,845 households, out of which 24.1% had children under the age of 18 living with them, 34.1% were married couples living together, 13.0% had a female householder with no husband present, and 50.1% were non-families. 32.1% of all households were made up of individuals, and 6.3% had someone living alone who was 65 years of age or older. The average household size was 2.35 and the average family size was 2.92.

The age distribution, strongly influenced by the presence of Mississippi State, was 18.8% under 18, 29.7% from 18 to 24, 26.6% from 25 to 44, 15.2% from 45 to 64, and 9.4% who were 65 years of age or older. The median age was 25 years. For every 100 females, there were 102.0 males. For every 100 females age 18 and over, there were 101.5 males.

The median income for a household in the city was $31,357, and the median income for a family was $40,557. Males had a median income of $35,782 versus $23,711 for females. The per capita income for the city was $22,787. About 19.1% of families and 33.6% of the population were below the poverty line, including 29.3% of those under age 18 and 17.8% of those age 65 or over.

Religion
Starkville has more than 80 places of worship, which serve most religious traditions. Faculty, staff and students at Mississippi State University, including those from other nations, have greatly increased the city's diversity.  As of October 2007, approximately half (49.74%) of the residents of Starkville claim a religious affiliation; most are Christian. Of those claiming affiliation, 41.59% self-identify as Protestant, including 25% Baptist and 11% Methodist. Lower percentages identify as Catholic, Mormon, Hindu and Muslim.

Arts and culture

Cotton District

The Cotton District is a neighborhood located in Starkville that was redeveloped as part of the new urbanism movement. It was founded in 1969 by Dan Camp, who was the developer, owner and property manager of much of the area.  The architecture of the Cotton District has historical elements and scale, with Greek Revival mixed with Classical or Victorian. It is a compact, walkable neighborhood that contains many restaurants and bars, in addition to thousands of unique residential units.

Libraries
The Starkville-Oktibbeha County Public Library System is headquartered at its main branch in Downtown Starkville. In addition to the local public library, the Mississippi State University Library has the largest collection in Mississippi.  The Mississippi State Mitchell Memorial Library also hosts the Ulysses S. Grant Presidential Library and the Frank and Virginia Williams Collection of Lincolniana.

Government
Executive and legislative authority in the city of Starkville is respectively vested in a mayor and seven-member board of aldermen concurrently elected to four-year terms. Since 2017 the mayor has been Lynn Spruill, a Democrat and the first female mayor elected in Starkville's history. Starkville has a strong-mayor government, with the mayor having the power to appoint city officials and veto decisions by the board of aldermen.

Starkville is split between Mississippi House districts 38 and 43, currently represented by Democrat Cheikh Taylor and Republican Rob Roberson. The city is similarly split between Mississippi Senate districts 15 and 16 represented by Republican Bart Williams and Democrat Angela Turner-Ford. Starkville and Oktibbeha County are in the northern districts of the Mississippi Transportation Commission and Public Service Commission, represented by Republican John Caldwell and Democrat Brandon Presley.

Starkville is in Mississippi's 3rd Congressional District, represented by Congressman Michael Guest.

Education

Public schools

In 1927, the city and the Rosenwald Foundation opened a pair of schools, the Rosenwald School and the Oktibbeha County Training School, later known as Henderson High School, for its African-American residents. In 1970, integration caused the merger of these schools with the white schools.
Henderson was repurposed as a junior high school, and the Rosenwald School was burned to the ground.

Until 2015, Starkville and much of the surrounding area was served by the Starkville School District (SSD) while Oktibbeha County was served by Oktibbeha County School District (OCSD). The two districts were realigned following integration in 1970 in a way that placed Starkville and majority-white, relatively affluent areas immediately outside of the city limits into SSD while the remaining portions of Oktibbeha County, which are over 90% Black, were placed into OCSD.  As a result of this disparity in the racial demographics of the two districts, Oktibbeha County was placed under a Federal desegregation order.  Previous attempts to consolidate the two districts during the 1990s and in 2010 had been unsuccessful, but following an act of the Mississippi Legislature the two were consolidated in 2015.  Contrary to predictions, the public schools experienced an inflow of students from private schools when the predominantly white Starkville School district merged with the predominantly black Oktibbeha schools.

The schools continue to operate under a Federal desegregation order.

The following schools of the Starkville Oktibbeha Consolidated School District are located in Starkville:

 Sudduth Elementary (grades K-1)
 Henderson Ward Stewart Elementary (grades 2–4)
 Overstreet Elementary (grade 5)
 Partnership Middle School (grades 6–7)
 Armstrong Junior High School (grades 8–9)
 Starkville High School (grades 10–12)
 Emerson Preschool 
 Millsaps Career & Technology Center

In 2015 it was announced that SOCSD and Mississippi State University would cooperate in establishing a partnership school. The school will be for all grade 6 and 7 students in Oktibbeha County and will be located on the Mississippi State University campus. The school will serve as an instructional site for students and faculty of Mississippi State University's College of Education, and as a one-of-a-kind rural education research center. Construction on the partnership school began in spring 2017. The school opened in August 2020.

Prior to integration, African-American students in Starkville attended the historic Henderson High School. The school was later re-purposed as Starkville School District's junior high school and is now an elementary school.

Private schools
Private schools in Starkville include:
 Starkville Academy, founded 1969
 Starkville Christian School, founded 1996

Starkville Academy has been described as a segregation academy.  Despite fears that the consolidation of the Starkville and Oktibbeha County school districts in 2015 would lead to additional White flight to private schools, district consolidation actually resulted in decreased enrollment at area private schools as more white parents living in Oktibbeha County opted to enroll their children in the consolidated district.

Tertiary education and libraries

Mississippi State University is partially in the Starkville city limits, and partially in the Mississippi State census-designated place.

East Mississippi Community College is the designated community college for the county, but does not operate facilities in it.

Starkville-Oktibbeha County Public Library System maintains the Starkville Library.

Media

Newspapers
 The Starkville Daily News
 The Reflector (MSU Student Newspaper)
 The Starkville Dispatch (a localized edition of The Commercial Dispatch)

Radio
 WMSV (Mississippi State Radio Station)
 WMAB (Public Radio)
 WMSU
 WQJB
 WMXU
 WJZB
 WSMS
 WSSO (WSSO was Starkville's first radio station, first broadcasting in 1949 at 250W on 1230 AM)

Television
 WCBI
 WTVA
 WLOV-TV

Magazines
 Town and Gown Magazine

Notable people

 Luqman Ali, musician
 Dee Barton, composer
 Cool Papa Bell, African-American baseball player; member of Baseball Hall of Fame
 Fred Bell, baseball player in the Negro leagues; brother of Cool Papa Bell
 Josh Booty, professional baseball and football player
 Julio Borbon, professional baseball player
 Marquez Branson, professional football player
 A. J. Brown, NFL wide receiver
 Harry Burgess, governor of the Panama Canal Zone, 1928–1932
 Cyril Edward Cain, preacher, professor, historian; lived in Starkville
 John Wilson Carpenter III, distinguished U.S. Air Force pilot and commander
 Jemmye Carroll, appeared on MTV's The Real World and The Challenge
 Joe Carter, professional football player
 Hughie Critz, professional baseball player
 Sylvester Croom, first black football coach in the Southeastern Conference
 Mohammad "Mo" Dakhlalla, convicted of offenses related to his attempts to join ISIS in Syria
 Willie Daniel, professional football player and businessman
 Kermit Davis, basketball player and coach
 Al Denson, musician and Christian radio and television show host
 Antuan Edwards, professional football player
 Drew Eubanks, basketball player
 Rockey Felker, football player and coach
 Willie Gay, Jr., NFL linebacker
 William L. Giles, former president of Mississippi State University; lived in Starkville
 Scott Tracy Griffin, author, actor, and pop culture historian
 Horace Harned, politician
 Helen Young Hayes, investment manager
 Kim Hill, Christian singer
 Shauntay Hinton, Miss District of Columbia USA 2002, Miss USA 2002
 Richard E. Holmes, medical doctor and one of the five young black Mississippians who pioneered the effort to desegregate the major universities of Mississippi; graduate of Henderson High School
 Bailey Howell, college and professional basketball player; lives in Starkville
 Gary Jackson, served in Mississippi Senate
 Paul Jackson, artist; spent childhood in Starkville
 Hayes Jones, gold medalist in 110-meter hurdles at Tokyo 1964 Olympics
 Martin F. Jue, amateur radio inventor, entrepreneur; founder of MFJ Enterprises
 Mark E. Keenum, president of Mississippi State University
 Harlan D. Logan, Rhodes Scholar, tennis coach, magazine editor, and politician
 Ray Mabus, former Mississippi governor
 Ben McGee, professional football player
 Jim McIngvale, businessman in Houston, Texas
 Shane McRae, actor
 William M. Miley, U.S. Army major general; professor of military science; lived in Starkville
 Freddie Milons, college and professional football player
 Leland Mitchell, professional basketball player
 Monroe Mitchell, professional baseball player
 William Bell Montgomery, agricultural publisher
 Jess Mowry, author of juvenile books
 Jasmine Murray, singer
 Travis Outlaw, professional basketball player
 Archie Pate, baseball player in the Negro leagues
 John Peoples, President of Jackson State University from 1967 to 1984
 Ron Polk, Olympic and college Baseball Coach.
 Del Rendon, musician; lived in Starkville
 Jerry Rice, professional football player; member of NFL Hall of Fame and College Football Hall of Fame
 Dero A. Saunders, journalist and author
 Bill Stacy, football player, mayor of Starkville
 Rick Stansbury, Basketball coach
 John Marshall Stone, longest-serving governor of Mississippi; second president of Mississippi State University; namesake of Stone County, Mississippi
 April Sykes, professional basketball player in the Women's National Basketball Association
 Amy Tuck, former Mississippi Lieutenant Governor; lives in Starkville
 Latavious Williams, professional basketball player
 Jaelyn Young, terrorist

In popular culture
Pilot Charles Lindbergh, the first to fly solo across the Atlantic Ocean, made a successful landing on the outskirts of Starkville in 1927 during his Guggenheim Tour. He stayed overnight at a boarding house in the Maben community. Lindbergh later wrote about that landing in his autobiographical account of his barnstorming days, titled WE.

Starkville is one of several places in the United States that claims to have created Tee Ball. Tee Ball was popularized in Starkville in 1961 by W.W. Littlejohn and Dr. Clyde Muse, members of the Starkville Rotarians.

Johnny Cash was arrested for public drunkenness (though he described it as being picked up for picking flowers) in Starkville and held overnight at the city jail on May 11, 1965. This inspired his song "Starkville City Jail":
They're bound to get you,
Cause they got a curfew,
And you go to the Starkville city jail.The song appears on the album At San Quentin.

From November 2 to 4, 2007, the Johnny Cash Flower Pickin' Festival was held in Starkville. At the festival, Cash was offered a symbolic posthumous pardon by the city. They honored Cash's life and music, and the festival was expected to become an annual event. The festival was started by Robbie Ward, who said: "Johnny Cash was arrested in seven places, but he only wrote a song about one of those places."

In 2021, a Mississippi Country Music Trail marker honoring Cash was installed in Starkville near the Oktibbeha County Jail.

In 2014, Gordon Ramsay visited the Hotel Chester in his series Hotel Hell in a successful attempt to help the struggling hotel remain in business.

References

External links

Official City of Starkville Website
Greater Starkville Development Partnership (GSDP) website
Starkville Daily News website

 
Cities in Mississippi
Cities in Oktibbeha County, Mississippi
County seats in Mississippi
Micropolitan areas of Mississippi
Articles containing video clips